The Ontario Cancer Institute (OCI) is the research division of Princess Margaret Cancer Centre, affiliated to the University Health Network of the University of Toronto Faculty of Medicine. As Canada's first dedicated cancer hospital, it opened officially and began to receive patients in 1958, although its research divisions had begun work a year earlier. Because, at that time, a stigma was associated with the word "cancer", the hospital was soon renamed the Princess Margaret Hospital, although the whole operation was called the Ontario Cancer Institute incorporating the Princess Margaret Hospital, or OCI/PMH. Clinicians usually preferred the hospital name, while the scientists used OCI.

The original location of the OCI/PMH was at 500 Sherbourne Street in Toronto. In 1995, the whole operation moved to a new building at 610 University Avenue, and the new Princess Margaret Hospital became part of the University Health Network. The OCI continued as the research arm of the PMH, that in 2012 changed its name in Princess Margaret Cancer Centre.

See also 
 Princess Margaret Cancer Centre
 University of Toronto
 Ernest McCulloch
 James Till

References

External links
Princess Margaret Hospital
Ontario Cancer Institute
Archival papers of Bernhard Cinader, the head of the Immunochemistry subdivision of the Ontario Cancer Institute in 1958, are held at University of Toronto Archives and Records Management Services

Hospital buildings completed in 1958
Hospital buildings completed in 1995
Hospitals in Toronto
Hospitals established in 1958